Tori language may refer to:

Tɔli language, a variety of the Phla–Pherá languages of West Africa
Taori language, any of several East Tariku languages of New Guinea, such as Sikaritai or Doutai